Aaron Lawrence (born 11 August 1970) is a Jamaican former professional footballer who played as a goalkeeper, making over 60 appearances for the Jamaica national team. In some sources, his birth date is 10 October 1968.

Club career
Aaron played almost whole of his career in his homeland, playing initially for Violet Kickers F.C., having a brief spell at Long Island Rough Riders at the United States and then returning to Jamaica to play for Reno F.C. He was on the verge of joining Birmingham City after obtaining a work permit, but the move fell through after he has broken his leg.

International career
Lawrence had been a member of the Jamaica national football team for a little more than a decade. His role was primarily as backup to team captain Warren Barrett, until one memorable performance in 1998 at the World Cup finals in France. Starting in Jamaica's third and final game against Japan, Lawrence shut out the relentless Japanese attackers until late in the game when one sneaked by him. He nevertheless protected Jamaica's slim lead and led them to their first World Cup Finals win, a 2-1 result.

He attempted to secure an overseas contract with a European Club but it proved futile, but the player had emerged as Jamaica's first-choice keeper and had hoped to lead the Jamaica national team to another World Cup appearance. However, with the emergence of Donovan Ricketts, the under twenty-three goalkeeper at the time, Lawrence never managed to fight his way back to the starter's position.

The 'Wild Boy' was a tall, athletic and fleet-footed professional. Although there was perhaps room for improvement in his positioning and handling of balls crossed into the six-yard box, in his defence he was known for pulling off spectacular and timely saves when it mattered most. His vast experience proved useful time and time again for the Jamaica national team in those tough away games. He scored a penalty for Jamaica against India in a friendly match in August 2002.

International goals

Coaching career
Lawrence coached Reno FC and also served as a goalkeeping coach for the national team, as well as the director of the Real Madrid Academy in Jamaica and manager of second tier Sandals Whitehouse. He is currently coach of the Jamaican national Under-15 team and Rusea's High School football team.

Personal life
Aaron's son, Ruel, was an attacking midfielder playing for Portmore United.

References

External links

1970 births
Living people
People from Hanover Parish
Jamaican footballers
Jamaica international footballers
1998 FIFA World Cup players
2000 CONCACAF Gold Cup players
2003 CONCACAF Gold Cup players
Association football goalkeepers